Doubt is a 2003 Filipino film about fidelity and deception in a gay relationship. Cris, a young director, meets Erick and develops a relationship with him. After being together for several months, their relationship began to fall apart and is complicated by other people getting involved in their lives.

Cast
 Andoy Ranay as Cris
 Paulo Gabriel as  Erick
 Larry Burns
 John Lapus
 Jojo Nones
 Rey Pumaloy

References

2003 films
2003 drama films
Philippine LGBT-related films
2000s Tagalog-language films
LGBT-related drama films
2003 LGBT-related films
Gay-related_films
Philippine drama films